Nordlaguna is a lagoon on the island of Jan Mayen. It is the second largest lake of Jan Mayen, after Sørlaguna, and is located in the central part of the island, near the bay of Stasjonsbukta.  It was possibly formed by an eruption of Beerenberg volcano in 1732. Before isolation from the ocean 220 calyr BP wat is now the Nordlaguna basin was a marine bay for about 2200 years. Before this, in a timespan between 2200 and 2400 calyr BP, it was mostly isolated from the ocean. This lake or lake-like period was preceded by at least 300–400 years of marine conditions.   

Its deepest part lie in the southeast reaching 36 m below sea level.

The lake hosts an isolated population of Arctic char.

References

Landforms of Jan Mayen
Lagoons of Norway